Santamarina is a surname. Notable people with the surname include:

Ángel Santamarina, Argentine fencer
Eduardo Santamarina (born 1968), Mexican actor
Enrique Santamarina (1870–1937), Argentine politician
José Santamarina (born 1963), Argentine rugby union player
Luis Santamarina (born 1942), Spanish cyclist
Mercedes Santamarina (1896–1972), Argentine art collector
Ramon Santamarina (1827–1904), Argentine businessman

See also
 Club y Biblioteca Ramón Santamarina or Santamarina, a football club named for the Argentine businessman, in Tandil, Buenos Aires Province
 Santa Marina (disambiguation)